Strollin' is a live album by jazz trumpeter Chet Baker, recorded 1985 at the 7th Jazz Festival of Münster, West Germany and released in 1986 by Enja Records. It features Chet Baker on trumpet and vocals, Belgian guitarist Philip Catherine, and Belgian bassist Jean-Louis Rassinfosse.

Track listing

 "Sad Walk" (Bob Zieff) – 9:58 Bonus track on CD release
 "Strollin'" (Horace Silver) – 9:10
 "Love for Sale" (Cole Porter) – 9:31
 "Leaving" (Richie Beirach) – 15:19
 "But Not for Me" (George Gershwin, Ira Gershwin) – 7:22

Personnel
Chet Baker – trumpet, vocals on "But Not for Me"
Philip Catherine – electric guitar
Jean-Louis Rassinfosse – double bass

Production notes:
Jörg Meilicke – recording
Frank Schraven – recording
H.J. Gally – cover art
Elisabeth Winckelmann – album design

References

Chet Baker live albums
1985 live albums
Enja Records live albums